The 1903 University of Utah football team was an American football team that represented the University of Utah as an independent during the 1903 college football season. In its fourth and final season under head coach Harvey Holmes, the team compiled a 3–5 record and outscored opponents by a total of 125 to 87. Quarterback Jimmy Wade was the team captain.

Schedule

References

University of Utah
Utah Utes football seasons
University of Utah football